Hinduism in Thailand is a minority religion followed by 80,000 (0.1%) of the population as of 2020. Despite being a Buddhist-majority nation, Thailand has a very strong Hindu influence. The majority of Thai Hindus reside in Bangkok, Chonburi, and Phuket.

History
  Although Thailand has never been a majority-Hindu country, it has been influenced by Hinduism. Despite the fact that today Thailand is a Buddhist-majority country, many elements of Thai culture and symbolism demonstrate Hindu influences and heritage.  Southeast Asia, including what is now Thailand, has been in contact with Hinduism through India for over 2000 years. Indian settlement in Southeast Asia has been ongoing since the 6th century BCE and has continued into the modern era, influenced by various socioeconomic and political factors. Tamil and Gujarati immigrants migrated to Thailand in the late 1800s, working in the gem and textile industries, followed by a larger migration of both Sikhs and Hindus from Punjab in the 1890s.  

The popular Thai epic Ramakien is based on the Buddhist Dasaratha Jataka, which is a Thai variant of the Hindu epic Ramayana. The national emblem of Thailand depicted Garuda, the vahana (mount) of Vishnu.   

The city Ayutthaya, near Bangkok, is named after Ayodhya, the birthplace of Rama. Numerous rituals derived from Hinduism are preserved in rituals, such as the use of holy strings and pouring of water from conch shells. Furthermore, Hindu-Buddhist deities are worshiped by many Thais, such as Brahma at the famous Erawan Shrine, and statues of Ganesh, Indra, and Shiva. Reliefs in temple walls, such as the 12th-century Prasat Sikhoraphum near Surin (Thailand), show a dancing Shiva, with smaller images of Parvati, Vishnu, Brahma, and Ganesha.

The Devasathan is a Hindu temple established in 1784 by King Rama I. The temple is the centre of Hindus in Thailand. The royal court Brahmins operate the temple and perform several royal ceremonies per year.

An annual Giant Swing ceremony known as Triyampavai-Tripavai was held in major cities of Thailand until 1935, when it was abolished for safety reasons. The name of the ceremony was derived from the names of two Tamil language Hindu chants: Thiruvempavai and Thiruppavai. It is known that Tamil verses from Thiruvempavai — poet pratu sivalai ("opening the portals of Shiva's home") — were recited at this ceremony, as well as the coronation ceremony of the Thai king. According to T.P. Meenakshisundaram, the name of the festival indicates that Thiruppavai might have been recited as well. The swinging ceremony depicted a legend about how the god created the world. Outside shops, particularly in towns and rural areas, statues of Nang Kwak as the deity of wealth, fortune and prosperity (version of Lakshmi) are found.

The elite, and the royal household, often employ Brahmins to mark funerals and state ceremonies such as the Royal Ploughing Ceremony to ensure a good harvest. The importance of Hinduism cannot be denied, even though much of the rituals has been combined with Buddhism.

Thai Brahmin community

Thailand has two ethnic Thai Brahmin communities - Brahm Luang (Royal Brahmins) and Brahm Chao Baan (folk Brahmins). All ethnic Thai Brahmins are Buddhist by religion, who still worship Hindu Gods. The Brahm Luang (Royal Brahmins) mainly perform royal ceremonies of the Thai monarch, including crowning of the king. They belong to the long family bloodline of Brahmins in Thailand, who originated from Tamil Nadu. The folk Brahmins are the category of Brahmins who are not from a lineage of priests. Generally, these Brahmins have less knowledge about the rituals and ceremonies. Apart from this there are also Indian Brahmins from India who migrated to Thailand more recently.

Brahmins once conducted the royal ceremony in other Southeast Asian countries as well. The rituals were reinstated in Cambodia after the overthrow of the Khmer Rouge. The Brahmins of Myanmar have lost their role due to the abolition of monarchy.

Historian Damrong Rajanubhab has mentioned about three kind of Brahmins, from Nakhòn Sī Thammarāt, from Phatthalung, and those who originated from Cambodia.

Indian Hindus
During the Sukhothai and Ayutthaya periods, evidence of the presence of sizable number of Indians in the Thai court is described by a number of western travelers. However most of the contemporary Indians came to Thailand after 1920, and during the first half of the 19th century.

The Mariamman Temple, Bangkok is the first temple built in the South Indian architectural style. It was built in 1879 by Vaithi Padayatchi, a Tamil Hindu immigrant.

Demographics

According to the 2005 Thai census, there are 52,631 Hindus living in Thailand, making up just 0.09% of the total population. In the 2010 census, that number decreased to 41,808 Hindus in Thailand, constituting 0.06% of the population. In the 2015 census, this population decreased to 22,110, or 0.03%.

However, the Pew research data found that Hinduism constituted 0.1% of the Thai population in 2014 and is increasing in Thailand as a percentage of the country's population. The Pew research data reports that the Hindu population is expected to increase from 0.1% in 2014 to 0.2% by 2050.

Hindu sites in Thailand

See also

 Hinduism in Southeast Asia
 Religion in Thailand
 Hinduism in Vietnam

References

 
Hinduism in Southeast Asia
Religion in Thailand